Üçüncü is a Turkish surname. Notable people with the surname include:

Bülent Üçüncü, Turkish footballer
Hasan Üçüncü, Turkish footballer

See also
Üçüncü Ağalı
Üçüncü Beynəlmiləl
Üçüncü Mahmudlu

Turkish-language surnames